James Enge is the pseudonym of James M. Pfundstein, an American fantasy and sword and sorcery author. His best known work is the ongoing Morlock the Maker series. His first novel in the series, Blood of Ambrose, was nominated for the World Fantasy Award in 2010. His newest series, A Tournament of Shadows, tells the origin story of his famous character Morlock Ambrosius.

Biography
Pfundstein has a PhD from the University of Minnesota  and is a teaching professor at Bowling Green State University in the World Languages and Cultures Department. He is represented by the Onyxhawke Agency.

Bibliography

Novels

Morlock the Maker
 Blood of Ambrose (2009), 
 This Crooked Way (2009), 
 The Wolf Age (2010), 

A Tournament of Shadows
 A Guile of Dragons (2012), 
 Wrath-Bearing Tree (2013), 
 The Wide World's End (2015),

Morlock the Maker Short Stories published in Black Gate, online and elsewhere

 Turn Up This Crooked Way (2005)
 "A Covenant With Death"
 "The Red Worm's Way"
 "Payment Deferred" (2005)
 "A Book Of Silences" (2007)
 The Lawless Hours (2007)
 "The Gordian Stone" (2008)
 Payment In Full
 "Fire and Sleet" (2009)
 "Traveller's Rest" (2010)
 "Laws for the Blood" (2020)

Works in the episodic novel This Crooked Way

 The War Is Over
 "Interlude: Telling the Tale"
 "Blood From A Stone"
 "Payment Deferred"
 "Fire and Water"
 An Old Lady and a Lake
 Interlude: Book of Witness
 The Lawless Hours
 Payment in Full
 Destroyer
 Whisper Street
 Interlude: The Anointing
 Traveller's Dream
 Where Nurgnatz Dwells
 Interlude: How the Story Ends
 Spears of Winter Rain
 Calendar and Astronomy
 Sources and Backgrounds for Arthurian Legends

Other stories
 "Brother Solson and Sister Luna" (2008)

Academic
 Per astra ad aspera: Aeneid 6.725. In Vergilius. v. 43; 1997. [n.p.] Vergilian Society. p. 22-30.
 Review of S. Byrne, E.P. Cueva, Veritatis Amicitiaeque Causa: Essays in Honor of Anna Lydia Motto and John R. Clark in the Bryn Mawr Classical Review
 Doctoral Dissertation : Not Only the City: Cosmography in the Tragedies of Seneca (2000)
 Λαμπροὺϛ Δυνάσταϛ: Aeschylus, Astronomy and the Agamemnon The Classical Journal, Vol. 98, No. 4 (Apr. - May, 2003), pp. 397-410
 Phaedra on the Tiles: Seneca Phaedra 1154ff (2004)
 Libretto Translation of Gli amori d'Apollo e di Dafne (2005)
 Libretto Translation of La Virtu de’ Strali d'Amore (2007)

References

External links
James Enge Official website
James Enge's Blog
James Enge's Twitter
James Enge (ology)
James Enge on Facebook
Q&A with Stargate Producer Joseph Mallozzi
Review of Blood of Ambrose at Fantasy Book Critic
Long Detailed Review of Blood of Ambrose at Not Free SF Reader
Fantasy Book Critic Interview

21st-century American novelists
American fantasy writers
American male novelists
University of Minnesota alumni
Living people
American male short story writers
21st-century American short story writers
21st-century American male writers
Year of birth missing (living people)
Bowling Green State University faculty